Abasin Arts Council (formerly Abasin Arts Society) is an art gallery and exhibition centre in Peshawar, Pakistan. Council is located behind the Peshawar Museum.

History 
Abasin Arts Society was established in October 1955 by the Commissioner of Peshawar Division, Musarat Husain Zuberi. It was registered under the Societies Registration Act, 1880. In 1967 its name was changed to Abasin Arts Council. Council's present building was constructed later behind the Peshawar Museum.

References 

1955 establishments in Pakistan
Arts centres in Pakistan
Art museums and galleries in Pakistan
Buildings and structures in Peshawar
Arts organisations based in Pakistan